Hammerin' Hero, known in Japan as  and in Europe as GenSan, is a 2008 platform video game for the PlayStation Portable handheld. It is the eighth and most recent game in the Hammerin' Harry series excluding spin-offs. The game was developed and published by Irem in Japan, while it was later published by Atlus in North America and by DHM Interactive in Europe.

Reception

Hammerin' Hero received mixed to positive reviews from critics. On Metacritic, the game holds a score of 73/100 based on 19 reviews.

Sam Bishop of IGN gave the game an 8.8/10, praising the gameplay and art style while describing it as "[managing] to not feel old, just... retro". Tom McShea of GameSpot was less receptive to the game, giving it a 6/10 while criticizing its gameplay as being "repetitive" and "formulaic".

References

2008 video games
Atlus games
Irem games
Platform games
PlayStation Portable games
PlayStation Portable-only games
Video games developed in Japan
Video games with cel-shaded animation